Harry Fitch Klinefelter Jr. (March 20, 1912 – February 20, 1990) was an American rheumatologist and endocrinologist. Klinefelter syndrome is named after him.

Biography
Klinefelter studied first at the University of Virginia, Charlottesville, and then attained his medical degree from Johns Hopkins School of Medicine. After his graduation in 1937 he continued his training in internal medicine at the Johns Hopkins Hospital. Klinefelter worked at the Massachusetts General Hospital in Boston from 1941 to 1942; under the supervision of Fuller Albright he described a group of nine men with "gynecomastia, aspermatogenesis without aleydigism, and increased excretion of follicle-stimulating hormone", the first description of what would be called the Klinefelter syndrome. Initially he suspected this to be endocrine disorder and postulated the presence of a second testicular hormone, but in 1959, Patricia A. Jacobs and Dr. J. A. Strong (Western General Hospital and University of Edinburgh) demonstrated that a male patient with the phenotype of Klinefelter syndrome had an additional X chromosome (47 XXY).  Klinefelter confirmed, later, that the cause was chromosomal, rather than hormonal.

Klinefelter served in the Armed Forces from 1943 to 1946 and then returned to Johns Hopkins where he remained during his professional life. In 1966 he was named associate professor. He retired at the age of 76.

References

External links
Harry Klinefelter at whonamedit.com

1912 births
1990 deaths
American endocrinologists
Johns Hopkins Hospital physicians
Johns Hopkins University alumni
Johns Hopkins University faculty
University of Virginia alumni
American rheumatologists